Tumat Sogolik (born 5 May 1955) is a Papua New Guinean boxer. He represented his country in the bantamweight division at the 1976 Summer Olympics. He won his first match over Samuel Meck. He lost his second match against Chul Soon-Hwang.

He later competed in boxing in the 1978 Commonwealth Games in Edmonton, Canada. He won silver in the Bantamweight division after losing to Barry McGuigan of Northern Ireland. Tumat presently lives on Tsoi Island in the New Ireland Province of Papua New Guinea.

References

Living people
Bantamweight boxers
Papua New Guinean male boxers
Commonwealth Games silver medallists for Papua New Guinea
Boxers at the 1978 Commonwealth Games
Commonwealth Games medallists in boxing
Olympic boxers of Papua New Guinea
Boxers at the 1976 Summer Olympics
1955 births
Medallists at the 1978 Commonwealth Games